Buzara frontinus  is a moth of the family Erebidae. It is found in the coastal areas of southern Queensland and New South Wales.

The wingspan is about 60 mm.

The larvae feed on Breynia species.

References

External links
Australian Caterpillars

Calpinae
Moths described in 1805